Lisa Louise Mckenzie (born March 1968) is a British anarchist and research fellow at the University of Durham whose work relates to class inequality, social justice, and British working class culture. She was active in the Class War party and her research and politics have been influenced by being a working-class mother of a mixed-race child in a poor area of Nottingham where she grew up.

Early life and education
McKenzie was born in March 1968 and grew up in Sutton-in-Ashfield. She moved from predominantly white suburbs to the inner city of Nottingham where she had her mixed-race son in 1988 as there were more black people there and she felt more comfortable. McKenzie attended university by going on an access course through which she realised that she could enter higher education. She earned her BA in 2004 and her master's degree in research methods from the University of Nottingham in 2005. She completed her doctorate in 2009 on "Finding value on a council estate: complex lives, motherhood, and exclusion", also at Nottingham, which dealt with working-class mothers with mixed-race children on the St Ann's estate where she lived at the time. The decision to choose that topic was a result of McKenzie's experiences.

Politics and activism
Mckenzie is active in left-wing politics and regularly attends demonstrations in London. She opposes social mobility and instead wants the living standards of all working-class people to rise. She opposes private education and the charitable status of private schools. She opposes the sale of public housing through the right-to-buy legislation and wants to keep it public. In April 2015, she was arrested at a protest over the "poor door" at One Commercial Street in London and charged with three public order offences. She was subsequently found not guilty of joint enterprise for causing criminal damage, after a sticker was fixed on a window, as well as acquitted of intent to cause alarm and distress and causing alarm and distress due to lack of evidence.

In the 2015 United Kingdom general election, McKenzie was the Class War party candidate for the Chingford and Woodford Green constituency; she came last, receiving 53 votes (0.1 per cent of the votes cast). The Member of Parliament, Iain Duncan Smith, was re-elected. The Class War party was voluntarily deregistered with the electoral commission in July 2015, 17 months after initial registration.

McKenzie has described the phenomenon of gentrification as a "violent process”. In September 2015, Mckenzie took part in an anti-gentrification protest in London in which the Cereal Killer Cafe was vandalised. She was criticised for saying that the publicity was good for the owners.

Media appearances
In 2012, McKenzie appeared on BBC Radio 4's Thinking Allowed with Laurie Taylor to discuss working class alienation in Nottingham.

Selected publications

See also
 John Hills

References 

1968 births
Living people
People from Sutton-in-Ashfield
Academics of the London School of Economics
Alumni of the University of Nottingham
Political activists
British political candidates
Academics of Durham University
British sociologists